John D. Marshall is an American entrepreneur and inventor. He is the co-founder and former president and CEO of AirWatch, which VMware acquired for $1.54 billion in 2014. He is co-chairman at a software start-up called OneTrust.

Career 
In 1996, Marshall was hired as an implementation consultant at Manhattan Associates, a supplier of field inventory management software. He had various consulting roles designing and implementing complex supply chain systems. He spent 18 months helping to launch the company's presence in Europe and assisted in the design of multiple software modules relating to transportation, load planning and global logistics.

Celarix later hired Marshall as vice president for marketing strategy in 1999. He was responsible for designing the company's product solutions, developing the go-to-market strategy and leading business development activities with technology and transportation partners in North America, Europe and Asia. GXS Worldwide, Inc., formerly GE Information Systems, acquired Celarix in 2003.

Marshall founded Wandering WiFi in 2003. The company started by setting up hospitality businesses with internet hot spots and Marshall grew the customer base and extended the software to monitor and manage other types of network infrastructure.

In 2006, Alan Dabbiere, founder and former president of Manhattan Associates, joined the business and together they launched AirWatch to accelerate development on managing Windows Mobile devices. After the launch of the iPhone, they pivoted the company to develop software to manage smartphones.

During a press conference with Georgia Governor Nathan Deal on Jan. 25, 2013, Marshall and Dabbiere announced that AirWatch would create 800 additional jobs in Georgia over two years and invest more than $4 million in new equipment. In three years, the company grew from 100 employees to more than 1,500.

In February 2013, AirWatch secured a $200 million Series A funding round, the largest Series A round of any software company in history, from Insight Venture Partners and Accel Partners. AirWatch also stated the company's revenues had grown 40 percent quarter over quarter for the previous eight quarters.

In July 2013, AirWatch acquired Motorola Solutions' MSP (Mobility Services Platform) to extend management capabilities to ruggedized devices.

In January 2014, VMware acquired AirWatch for $1.54 billion, the largest acquisition to-date for VMware. During the Q4 2014 earnings call, VMware announced that AirWatch reached $200 million in 2014 bookings, 2,000 employees and more than 15,000 customers as of January 2015, making it the largest enterprise mobility management provider in terms of revenue, customers and employees. Some of the companies using AirWatch include Wal-Mart Stores Inc., The Home Depot Inc., Walgreens, Delta Air Lines, and the Department of Justice. As of February 2015, the AirWatch app was ranked as the second top free business application.

As of March 2016 he stepped down as CEO and took up a position as an Advisory Board Member, a position which he held until December 2016.

After stepping down from his role at VMWare AirWatch, John became co-chairman alongside long-time colleague and former chairman at AirWatch Alan Dabbiere at OneTrust, a privacy management software platform.

Awards and recognition 
In 2014, Atlanta Business Chronicle named Marshall one of Atlanta's Most Admired CEOs, Mobile Village named Marshall the year's Mobile Visionary and Best in Biz named Marshall Executive of the Year.

Marshall was named the 2013 Ernst & Young Entrepreneur of the Year and the Association of Telecom Professionals selected Marshall as the 2012 ATP of the year, which recognizes individuals for their contributions to industry and community.

Under Marshall's leadership, AirWatch received several industry awards, including a 2015 Global Mobile Award from GSMA Mobile World Congress, two 2014 Global Mobile Awards, three 2013 MobITS Awards from CTIA and the Best Mobile Security Solution from SC Magazine.

Marshall is a board member on the Georgia Tech Information Security Center (GTISC) Industry Advisory Board.

Marshall was featured on CNBC in 2014 to discuss smartphone applications and the New York Times included his perspective on Samsung in the enterprise in 2013.

References

Year of birth missing (living people)
Living people
20th-century American businesspeople
21st-century American businesspeople
American inventors